Kastamonu Gazi Stadium is a football stadium in Kastamonu, Turkey. It is used mostly for football matches and was the home ground of Kastamonuspor. After dissolution of the team, the stadium became the home ground of Kastamonuspor 1966. The stadium was opened in 1984, and holds 4,500 spectators.

The stadium renewed in the 2009-2010 season.

References

External links
 "Kastamonu Gazi Stadium." Turkish Football Federation. 2009. 

Football venues in Turkey
Kastamonu
Sports venues completed in 1984
Buildings and structures in Kastamonu Province
1984 establishments in Turkey